Adnan Aganović (born 3 October 1987) is a Croatian professional footballer who plays as a midfielder for Liga I side Sepsi OSK.

Club career

Born in Dubrovnik, Aganović started his professional career with Croatian teams Dubrovnik 1919, GOŠK Dubrovnik, Trogir, playing in the lower Croatian football leagues.
In Croatian first league he played for Međimurje and Varaždin. While with Varaždin, he played in Europa League 2011/2012 qualifications in which he scored and assisted against Dinamo București in third qualifications round. After Varaždin he played for Slovenian side Koper, where he became established as one of the best attacking midfielders in that part of Europe. In the next season he returned to Croatian first league side Istra 1961 in which he continued his progress. In the 2013/2014 season, he signed for Romanian side Brasov.
After two years in Brasov, on the start of season 2015/2016. he signed for ambitious Romanian side Viitorul Constanţa, where he should be one of the most important players. On winter break of season 2015/2016., after ha was one of the best Viitorul players he moved to Cypriot top side AEL Limassol. In the summer of 2016., he signed for Romanian giants Steaua București, and with them he had opportunity to play in Champions League playoffs against Manchester City. After spending half season to Steaua București, on winter break of season 2016/2017 he moved to Greek side AEL.

Career statistics

Club

Honours

Club
 GOŠK Dubrovnik 
Treća HNL – South: 2005–06

 Trogir 
Treća HNL – South: 2006–07

 Varaždin
Croatian Cup runner-up: 2010–11

 Steaua București 
Cupa Ligii: 2015–16

AEL Limassol
Cypriot Cup: 2018–19
Cypriot Super Cup runner-up: 2019 

Sepsi OSK 
Cupa României: 2021–22
Supercupa României: 2022

References

External links
Hrsport.net

1987 births
Living people
Sportspeople from Dubrovnik
Bosniaks of Croatia
Croatian Muslims
Association football midfielders
Croatian footballers
NK GOŠK Dubrovnik players
HNK Trogir players
NK Međimurje players
NK Varaždin players
FC Koper players
NK Istra 1961 players
FC Brașov (1936) players
FC Viitorul Constanța players
AEL Limassol players
FC Steaua București players
Athlitiki Enosi Larissa F.C. players
Altay S.K. footballers
Sepsi OSK Sfântu Gheorghe players
Second Football League (Croatia) players
Croatian Football League players
Slovenian PrvaLiga players
Liga I players
Cypriot First Division players
Super League Greece players
TFF First League players
Croatian expatriate footballers
Expatriate footballers in Slovenia
Croatian expatriate sportspeople in Slovenia
Expatriate footballers in Romania
Croatian expatriate sportspeople in Romania
Expatriate footballers in Cyprus
Croatian expatriate sportspeople in Cyprus
Expatriate footballers in Greece
Croatian expatriate sportspeople in Greece
Expatriate footballers in Turkey
Croatian expatriate sportspeople in Turkey